L'Étoile sportive catalane is a rugby union club based in France at Argelès-sur-Mer. It plays in Fédérale 2, the fourth level of French rugby union.

History 

The club was founded in 1912 as Union sportive argelésienne, in 1921, became Grenouille argelésienne, then Étoile sportive argelésienne, and in the 90's Étoile sportive catalane.

In the 60's the club played in regional championship and was promoted in third (Excellence) in 1968. Winning the title in 1970, was promoted in second division, returning in the third in 1976. In the 90's was promoted in group A2 and from there in 1996 arrived to play the eights of finals for the title of French Champion, losing against Toulose).

This could permit to the club to play in 1996-97 in first division, but the Board of the club refused, due economics difficulties.

Palmarès 
 1964 and 1967 : Champion of Roussillon Honneur (4th div)
 1970 : Champion of France "Excellence" (3th national division)
 1971 : Eights of finals in the second division championship
 1996 : Eights of finals in the 1995-96 French Championship
 2005 : Finalist of  Fédérale 2 championship

Famous players 
 Marc Lièvremont  formed in the club
 Thomas Lièvremont formed in the club
 Matthieu Lièvremont formed in the club
 Sylvain Deroeux (1996-1997)
 Nicolas Mas formed in the club
 Benoit Cabello (jusqu'en 2002) formed in the club
 Olivier Benassis formed in the club
 Jérôme Schuster  formed in the club
 Vincent Sabardeil (2005-)
 Patrick Arlettaz (2006-2007)
 Benjamin Goze (2006-2007)
 Sébastien Mercier (2007-2008 2009-..)
 Diego Giannantonio (2008-2009)
 Nicolas Grelon (2009-2011)
 Bruno Rolland
 Fabien Sabathier
 Thomas Bouquié (2011-2012)

Roster

Notes and references

External links 
 Official site

Etoile Catalan
Etoile Catalan
1912 establishments in France